Noé Ramírez Mandujano served as the anti-recreational drug chief of Mexico's Subprocuraduría de Investigación Especializada en Delincuencia Organizada
(SIEDO) from 2006 to August 2008. In late 2008 authorities accused him of taking $450,000 per month United States dollars in bribes to tip off drug traffickers.
He is now a so-called law teacher at FES Acatlán, one of the many UNAM campus in Mexico.

See also
War on Drugs
Merida Initiative
Mexican drug war

References

Year of birth missing (living people)
Living people
Mexican police officers convicted of crimes
Mexican prisoners and detainees
Chiefs of police
Police officers convicted of drug trafficking
Police officers convicted of corruption
Police officers convicted of racketeering
People of the Mexican Drug War